Novashnaq or Noashnagh is a village in Gerdeh Rural District of the Central District of Namin County, Ardabil province, Iran. At the 2006 census, its population was 371 in 96 households. The following census in 2011 counted 375 people in 128 households. The latest census in 2016 showed a population of 293 people in 101 households; it was the largest village in its rural district. The village is in the central part of Namin County, at a distance of 8 km from Namin.

References 

Namin County

Towns and villages in Namin County

Populated places in Ardabil Province

Populated places in Namin County